William Drake White (born October 3, 1983) is an American country music singer and the leader of Drake White & The Big Fire.

Early life
White was born in Hokes Bluff, Alabama, where he attended Hokes Bluff High School.  White started writing his thoughts down when he was 14, some of which would later become lyrics in his songs.  He started singing when he was asked to join the youth choir at First Baptist Church of Hokes Bluff by his parents. He later attended Gadsden State Community College and then Auburn University, graduating with a degree in building science. Later, he worked with a general contractor in Nashville, Tennessee before quitting that job in favor of a musical career.

Music career
In concert, he and his band ("Drake White & The Big Fire") opened up performances for such musicians as Eric Church, Luke Bryan, Lynyrd Skynyrd, Tyler Bryant, and Channing Wilson. White has opened for Little Big Town and the Zac Brown Band.

In early 2013, he released his debut single "Simple Life" through MCA Nashville. White signed to Big Machine Records' re-establishment of Dot Records in June 2014. The first single, "It Feels Good" released to country radio on February 24, 2015. The second single, "Livin' the Dream" released to country radio on December 7, 2015. On August 19, 2016, White released "Spark", his debut album  under Dot Records.  It charted at No. 4 on the Top Country Albums chart.  The album's third single, "Makin' Me Look Good Again", was released in 2016.  A new 5-song EP titled "Pieces" was released on May 4, 2018.

Personal life
In January 2019, White was diagnosed with arteriovenous malformation (AVM), a rare vascular disorder.

Discography

Studio albums

Extended plays

Singles

Music videos

References

21st-century American singers
American country singer-songwriters
American male singer-songwriters
Auburn University alumni
Country musicians from Alabama
Country musicians from Tennessee
Dot Records artists
Living people
MCA Records artists
Musicians from Nashville, Tennessee
People from Etowah County, Alabama
Singer-songwriters from Tennessee
1983 births
21st-century American male singers
Singer-songwriters from Alabama